Mary D. (Maud) Molson Hughes (September 26, 1846 – August 26, 1881) was a suffragist, lecturer, and orator. She was a member of the National Woman Suffrage Association (NWSA) and delivered speeches across the country, advocating for the equal rights of African-American men and women to vote.

Early life 
Mary D. Molson was born in Williamsport, Pennsylvania, on September 26, 1846, to parents John and Louisa Clark Molson. She was the third of six children; her siblings included James S., Ellen R., John, Samuel J., Josey, and Charles Summer Molson.

Career 
Molson was a lecturer, orator, and African-American suffragist, advocating that Black women have as much right to vote as Black men.

After leaving Alfred University, she "lectured around western New York in the spring of 1869 with Charles Lenox Remond, a well-known Massachusetts abolitionist, in support of the Fifteenth Amendment."

In 1869, she spoke at the Colored Men's Convention in Binghamton, New York, participated in the jubilee procession of emancipation through the Eighth Ward, and she spoke at Wesley Union A.M.E. Zion Church. The Harrisburg Telegraph described the evening of September 14:

Personal life 
Mary Molson lived in Addison, New York, until she was 18 years old.

Molson attended Alfred University (1862-1863) and graduated with highest honors.

She married Orra L. C. Hughes, and they had a daughter, Lulu Missouri (Hughes) Brown, in 1870.

Death 
Molson died at the age of 35, on August 26, 1881, due to "inflammatory rheumatism" and an accompanying bacterial infection known as "pyanemia," and she is buried at Collins Center Cemetery, Collins Center, Cattaraugus County, New York.

References 

1846 births
1881 deaths
American suffragists
First-wave feminism
History of women's rights in the United States
People from Williamsport, Pennsylvania
African-American suffragists
Alfred University alumni